The Battle of El Alamein is a 1969 war film directed in 1969 by Giorgio Ferroni. It was an international co-production between Italy and France. The film depicts the Second Battle of El Alamein.

Plot
Made with the cooperation of the Italian army, the film is told through a company of the 185th Paratroopers Division "Folgore" commanded by Lieutenant (Lt.) Giorgio Borri. The inexperienced Lt. Borri is assisted by his brother, Sergeant Major (Sgt. Maj.) Claudio Borri, a seasoned veteran of the Bersaglieri. Barri's British counterpart is Lt. Graham, with the two first coming face to face when Barri is captured.

The film also features Field Marshal Erwin Rommel, Marshal of Italy Ettore Bastico, and Generals (Gen.) Bernard Law Montgomery, Georg Stumme and Wilhelm Ritter von Thoma.

Cast
Frederick Stafford as Lt. Giorgio Borri
George Hilton as Lt. Graham
Michael Rennie as Gen. Bernard Law Montgomery
Robert Hossein as Field Marshal Erwin Rommel
Enrico Maria Salerno as Sgt. Maj. Claudio Borri
Marco Guglielmi as Captain Hubert
Ettore Manni as Italian Captain
Gérard Herter as Brigadier General Schwartz
Ira von Fürstenberg as Marta
Giuseppe Addobbati as Gen. Georg Stumme
Manlio Busoni as Gen. Ettore Bastico 
Salvatore Borgese as Kapow
Luciano Catenacci as Sgt. O'Hara
Nello Pazzafini as Italian Sergeant
Tom Felleghy as Wilhelm Ritter von Thoma

Release
The Battle of El Alamein was released in Italy on January 23, 1969.

References

External links

Films directed by Giorgio Ferroni
Films scored by Carlo Rustichelli
Macaroni Combat films
1969 war films
North African campaign films
Cultural depictions of Erwin Rommel
Cultural depictions of Bernard Montgomery
French World War II films
Italian World War II films
1960s Italian films
1960s French films